Akram Haniyah (Born in Ramallah 1953) was an advisor to Yasir Arafat and a member of the Palestinian delegation to the 2000 Camp David Summit.

He was also editor-in-chief of the Palestinian newspaper al-Ayyam.

References

External links 
 Abstract of the Camp David Papers
 Not a Russian Dissident

Living people
Palestinian journalists
Fatah members
1953 births